Mart Võrklaev (born on 30 May 1984 in Tallinn) is an Estonian politician. He is a member of XIV Riigikogu.

2012–2019, he was Mayor of Rae Rural Municipality.

Since 2009, he is a member of Estonian Reform Party.

References

Living people
1984 births
Estonian Reform Party politicians
Estonian University of Life Sciences alumni
University of Tartu alumni
Mayors of places in Estonia
Politicians from Tallinn
Members of the Riigikogu, 2023–2027